Esen Buqa I was Khan of the Chagatai Khanate (1310 – c. 1318). He was the son of Duwa.

In 1309 Esen Buqa's brother Kebek ordered a meeting (quriltai) to determine the future of the khanate following his seizure of power. The meeting resulted in Esen Buqa being proclaimed khan.

Conflict with the Yuan dynasty and the Ilkhanate

Esen Buqa spent the bulk of his reign in conflict with two of his neighbors, the Yuan dynasty of China and the Ilkhanate of Persia. The Chaghadaids feared a Yuan-Ilkhanate alliance against the state; this fear was caused by the testimony of the Yuan's emissary to the Ilkhanate, Abishqa. The diplomat, while travelling through Central Asia, revealed to a Chaghadaid commander that such an alliance had been created, and Yuan-Ilkhanate forces were mobilizing to attack the khanate. Abishqa's testimony was never corroborated with any evidence, but Esen Buqa remained convinced of the truth of his statement. However, the Yuan armies repelled his troops twice in 1314. Only after Esen Buqa's death in 1318 and the ascension again of his brother Kebek to the Chagatai throne, allowed peace to prosper again in the region.

Genealogy of Chagatai Khanates

In Babr Nama written by Babur, Page 19, Chapter 1; described genealogy of his maternal grandfather Yunas Khan as:

References

Reuven Amitai & Michael Biran, Mongols, Turks, and Others. Koninklijke Brill NV, 2005, .

1318 deaths
Chagatai khans
14th-century monarchs in Asia
Year of birth unknown